Willy Camilo García Archivol (born September 4, 1992) is a Dominican professional baseball outfielder for the New Jersey Jackals of the Frontier League. He previously played in Major League Baseball (MLB) for the Chicago White Sox.

Career

Pittsburgh Pirates
García signed with the Pittsburgh Pirates as an international free agent in February 2010. He made his professional debut that season with the Dominican Summer League Pirates, batting .250/.333/.333 in 51 games. In 2011, he split the season between the GCL Pirates and the Low-A State College Spikes, accumulating a .266/.322/.440 slash line with 5 home runs and 35 RBI. The next year he played for the Single-A West Virginia Power and posted a .240/.286/.403 batting line with career-highs in home runs (18) and RBI (77). García spent the 2013 season with the High-A Bradenton Marauders, batting .256/.294/.437 with 16 home runs and 60 RBI. On June 25, 2013, he set the Marauders team record for hits in a game with six. García played the 2014 season with the Double-A Altoona Curve, posting a 271/.311/.478 slash line with 18 home runs and 63 RBI. He was added to the 40-man roster on November 20, 2014. He spent the entire 2015 season in the minors, splitting time with the Triple-A Indianapolis Indians and Altoona, posting a .275/.314/.431 batting line with 15 home runs and 67 RBI between the two teams. He spent the 2016 season in Indianapolis, hitting .245/.293/.366 with 6 home runs and 43 RBI. On December 31, 2016, García was designated for assignment by the Pirates.

Chicago White Sox
García was claimed off waivers by the Chicago White Sox on January 6, 2017. The White Sox promoted him to the major leagues on April 14 and he made his MLB debut that day. In 44 games in his rookie season with Chicago, García slashed .238/.305/.400 with 2 home runs and 12 RBI. On March 9, 2018, he was released by the White Sox organization.

Winnipeg Goldeyes
On February 11, 2019, García signed with the Winnipeg Goldeyes of the independent American Association. Before the 2019 season, he was selected for Dominican Republic national baseball team at the 2019 Pan American Games Qualifier, and he later played at the 2019 Pan American Games. In 86 games for Winnipeg, García slashed .310/.376/.548 with 17 home runs and 73 RBI. García did not play in a professional game in 2020.

Schaumburg Boomers
On March 24, 2021, García was traded to the Schaumburg Boomers of the Frontier League in exchange for a player to be named later. In 8 games for Schaumburg, García slashed .138/.265/.276 with 1 home run and 3 RBI.

Tri-City ValleyCats
On June 18, 2021, García was traded to the Tri-City ValleyCats of the Frontier League. He played in 58 games for the team down the stretch, slashing .297/.356/.455 with 6 home runs and 26 RBI.

In 2022, García appeared in 34 games for the ValleyCats, hitting .305/.352/.496 with 6 home runs and 24 RBI.

New Jersey Jackals
On July 4, 2022, García was traded to the High Point Rockers of the Atlantic League of Professional Baseball. García did not appear in a game for High Point and became a free agent after the season.

On February 21, 2023, García signed with the New Jersey Jackals of the Frontier League.

References

External links

1992 births
Living people
Águilas Cibaeñas players
Altoona Curve players
Baseball players at the 2019 Pan American Games
Bradenton Marauders players
Charlotte Knights players
Chicago White Sox players
Dominican Republic expatriate baseball players in Canada
Dominican Republic expatriate baseball players in the United States
Dominican Republic national baseball team players
Dominican Summer League Pirates players
Estrellas Orientales players
Gulf Coast Pirates players
Indianapolis Indians players
Leones del Escogido players
Major League Baseball outfielders
Major League Baseball players from the Dominican Republic
Pan American Games competitors for the Dominican Republic
Sportspeople from Santo Domingo
State College Spikes players
West Virginia Power players
Winnipeg Goldeyes players
Dominican Republic expatriate baseball players in Panama
Dominican Republic expatriate baseball players in Venezuela
Dominican Republic expatriate baseball players in Mexico
Tiburones de La Guaira players
Venados de Mazatlán players
Yaquis de Obregón players
Tri-City ValleyCats players
Schaumburg Boomers players
Dominican Republic expatriate baseball players in Nicaragua
Dominican Republic expatriate baseball players in Colombia